This is a list of mayors and the later lord mayors of the city of Norwich.

Norwich had elected a mayor since 1403 when a Charter of Henry IV allowed the Freemen of the city to elect Councillors, Aldermen, Sheriffs and a Mayor serving for one year. The city was awarded the dignity of a lord mayoralty by letters patent in 1910 "in view of the position occupied by that city as the chief city of East Anglia and of its close association with his Majesty" When Norwich became a metropolitan borough in 1974 the honour was reconfirmed by letters patent dated 1 April 1974.

Mayors of Norwich

Source (1900–2013): Norwich City Council

Lord mayors of Norwich
Source: Norwich City Council

References

Norwich, Lord Mayors of the City of
 
Lord Mayors
Lord Mayors of Norwich